Wikiwand, formerly stylized as WikiWand, is a proprietary interface developed for viewing Wikipedia articles. Its interface includes a sidebar menu displaying the table of contents, a navigation bar, personalized links to other languages, new typography, access to previews of linked articles, display advertisements, and sponsored articles. The interface is available on Chrome, Safari and Firefox as well as via Wikiwand's website. Wikiwand shares the users' personal information with Outbrain and other advertisers, as well as various service providers including Amazon, Google and Microsoft.

History 
Wikiwand was founded in 2013 by Lior Grossman and Ilan Lewin. It officially launched in August 2014.

In 2014, Wikiwand was able to raise $600,000 to support the development of the interface. According to Grossman, "It didn't make sense to us that the fifth most popular website in the world, used by half a billion people, has an interface that hasn't been updated in over a decade. We found the Wikipedia interface cluttered, hard to read, hard to navigate, and lacking in terms of usability."

In March 2015, Wikiwand released an iOS app for iPhone and iPad.

In February 2020, an Android app was under development.

In 2021, it was noted that visiting a Wikiwand page made the visitor's device exchange hundreds of requests and several megabytes of data with advertisers.

Notes

References

External links 

 

2014 software
Computer-related introductions in 2014
Interfaces
Wikipedia